is a professional Japanese baseball player. He plays outfielder for the Orix Buffaloes.

References 

1997 births
Living people
Baseball people from Chiba Prefecture
Japanese baseball players
Nippon Professional Baseball outfielders
Tokyo Yakult Swallows players